Men's 50 metre rifle three positions (then known as small-bore free rifle) was one of the thirteen shooting events at the 1988 Summer Olympics. It was the first Olympic three positions competition to feature final shooting. Alister Allan set a new Olympic record in the qualification round but lost the final to his countryman Malcolm Cooper, who thus defended his title from Los Angeles.

Qualification round

OR Olympic record – Q Qualified for final

Final

OR Olympic record

References

Sources

Shooting at the 1988 Summer Olympics
Men's 050m 3 positions 1988
Men's events at the 1988 Summer Olympics